Senator Snelling may refer to:

Barbara Snelling (1928–2015), Vermont State Senate
Diane B. Snelling (born 1952), Vermont State Senate